Yngvar Tørnros (28 June 1894 – 27 February 1967) was a Norwegian footballer. He played in five matches for the Norway national football team in 1916.

References

External links
 

1894 births
1967 deaths
Norwegian footballers
Norway international footballers
Place of birth missing
Association footballers not categorized by position